Angela Maree Warren-Clark (born 1971) is a New Zealand politician and Member of Parliament in the House of Representatives for the Labour Party.

Career before politics
Warren-Clark is a non-practicing barrister and solicitor. She has been active in the field of domestic violence since the early 2000s, and was the manager of Women's Refuge in Tauranga prior to her election. The refuge had to operate on a mere $21 a week fund from Government which she described as "appalling" and had to raise $500,000 every year in fundraising to sustain the refuge.

Political career
Warren-Clark stood for the Labour candidacy in the  electorate in 2017 but was beaten by Jan Tinetti. Her successful candidacy to represent Labour in the  electorate was announced in February 2017.

Member of Parliament

She also contested the Bay of Plenty electorate but was defeated by National MP Todd Muller by a margin of 13,996 votes. Initially she had not been elected on the provisional results, however Labour gained enough party votes when special votes were counted for Warren-Clark to be allocated a seat.

During the 2020 New Zealand general election, Warren-Clark contested the Bay of Plenty electorate again, standing against incumbent Todd Muller. She lost by a final margin of 3,415 votes. However, she was elected on the party list.

Private life
Warren-Clark has two adult children who live overseas. She is married to Blair, and they live in Papamoa. Warren-Clark has a law degree from the University of Waikato and was admitted to the bar in 1998.

References

1971 births
New Zealand Labour Party MPs
Members of the New Zealand House of Representatives
New Zealand list MPs
University of Waikato alumni
21st-century New Zealand politicians
21st-century New Zealand women politicians
Women members of the New Zealand House of Representatives
Living people
Candidates in the 2020 New Zealand general election